The Hotel Yancey in Grand Island, Nebraska, also known as The Yancey Motor Inn, is an eleven-story building built during 1917-1923 that remained, in 1982, the tallest building in the city.  Its design reflects Renaissance Revival architecture.

In 1982 it was under renovation that convert hotel rooms of its upper nine floors into 57 residential condo units.

It was listed on the National Register of Historic Places in 1984.

References

Hotel buildings completed in 1917
Grand Island, Nebraska
Renaissance Revival architecture in Nebraska
Buildings and structures in Hall County, Nebraska
Hotel buildings on the National Register of Historic Places in Nebraska
National Register of Historic Places in Hall County, Nebraska